George Nathaniel Curzon, 1st Marquess Curzon of Kedleston,  (11 January 1859 – 20 March 1925), styled Lord Curzon of Kedleston between 1898 and 1911 and then Earl Curzon of Kedleston between 1911 and 1921, was a British Conservative statesman who served as Viceroy of India from 1899 to 1905. 

During the First World War, Curzon was Leader of the House of Lords and from December 1916 served in the small War Cabinet of Prime Minister David Lloyd George and in the War Policy Committee. He went on to serve as Secretary of State for Foreign Affairs at the Foreign Office from 1919 to 1924.

In 1923, Curzon was a contender for the office of Prime Minister, but Bonar Law and some other leading Conservatives preferred Stanley Baldwin for the office.

Early life 

Curzon was the eldest son and the second of the eleven children of Alfred Curzon, 4th Baron Scarsdale (1831–1916), who was the Rector of Kedleston in Derbyshire. George Curzon's mother was Blanche (1837–1875), the daughter of Joseph Pocklington Senhouse of Netherhall in Cumberland. He was born at Kedleston Hall, built on the site where his family, who were of Norman ancestry, had lived since the 12th century. His mother, exhausted by childbirth, died when George was 16; her husband survived her by 41 years. Neither parent exerted a major influence on Curzon's life. Scarsdale was an austere and unindulgent father who believed that landowners should stay on their land and not indefinitely tour the world for pleasure. He disapproved of the journeys across Asia between 1887 and 1895 which made his son one of the most travelled men to be a member of any British cabinet. An influential presence in Curzon's childhood was that of his brutal, sadistic governess, Ellen Mary Paraman, whose tyranny in the nursery stimulated his combative qualities and encouraged the obsessional side of his nature. Paraman used to beat him and periodically forced him to parade through the village wearing a conical hat bearing the words liar, sneak, and coward. Curzon later noted, "No children well born and well-placed ever cried so much and so justly."

He was educated at Wixenford School, Eton College, and Balliol College, Oxford. His over-intimate relationship at Eton College with Oscar Browning led to the latter's dismissal. A spinal injury incurred while riding during his adolescence was a lifelong impediment to Curzon that required him to wear a metal corset for the remainder of his life.

Curzon was President of the Union and Secretary of the Oxford Canning Club (a Tory political club named for George Canning), but as a consequence of the extent of his time-expenditure on political and social societies, he failed to achieve a first class degree in Greats, although he subsequently won both the Lothian Prize Essay and the Arnold Prize, the latter for an essay on Sir Thomas More, about whom he knew little. In 1883, Curzon received the most prestigious fellowship at the university, a Prize Fellowship at All Souls College. While at Eton and at Oxford, Curzon was a contemporary and close friend of Cecil Spring Rice and Edward Grey. However, Spring Rice contributed, alongside John William Mackail, to the composition of a famous sardonic doggerel about Curzon that was published as part of The Balliol Masque, about which Curzon wrote in later life "never has more harm been done to one single individual than that accursed doggerel has done to me." It read:
My name is George Nathaniel Curzon,
I am a most superior person.
My cheek is pink, my hair is sleek,
I dine at Blenheim once a week.

When Spring-Rice was assigned to the British Embassy to the United States in 1894-1895, he was suspected by Curzon of trying to prevent Curzon's engagement to the American Mary Leiter, whom Curzon nevertheless married. However, Spring Rice assumed for a certainty, like many of Curzon's other friends, that Curzon would inevitably become Foreign Secretary: he wrote to Curzon in 1891, 'When you are Secretary of State for Foreign Affairs I hope you will restore the vanished glory of England, lead the European concert, decide the fate of nations, and give me three months' leave instead of two'.

Early political career 
Curzon became Assistant Private Secretary to the Marquess of Salisbury in 1885, and in 1886 entered Parliament as Member for Southport in south-west Lancashire. His maiden speech, which was chiefly an attack on home rule and Irish nationalism, was regarded in much the same way as his oratory at the Oxford Union: brilliant and eloquent but also presumptuous and rather too self-assured. Subsequent performances in the Commons, often dealing with Ireland or reform of the House of Lords (which he supported), received similar verdicts. He was Under-Secretary of State for India in 1891–92 and Under-Secretary of State for Foreign Affairs in 1895–98.

Asian travels and writings

In the meantime he had travelled around the world: Russia and Central Asia (1888–89), a long tour of Persia (September 1889 – January 1890), Siam, French Indochina and Korea (1892), and a daring foray into Afghanistan and the Pamirs (1894). He published several books describing central and eastern Asia and related policy issues. A bold and compulsive traveller, fascinated by oriental life and geography, he was awarded the Patron's Medal of the Royal Geographical Society for his exploration of the source of the Amu Darya (Oxus). His journeys allowed him to study the problems of Asia and their implications for British India, while reinforcing his pride in his nation and her imperial mission.

Curzon believed Russia to be the most likely threat to British India, Britain's most valuable possession, from the 19th century through the early 20th century. In 1879 Russia had begun construction of the Transcaspian Railway along the Silk Road, officially solely to enforce local control. The line starts from the city of Kyzyl-Su, formerly Krasnovodsk (nowadays Turkmenbashi) (on the Caspian Sea), travels southeast along the Karakum Desert, through Ashgabat, continues along the Kopet Dagh Mountains until it reaches Tejen. Curzon dedicated an entire chapter in his book Russia in Central Asia to discussing the perceived threat to British control of India. This railway connected Russia with the most wealthy and influential cities in Central Asia at the time, including the Persian province of Khorasan, and would allow the rapid deployment of Russian supplies and troops into the area. Curzon also believed that the resulting greater economic interdependence between Russia and Central Asia would be damaging to British interests.

Persia and the Persian Question, written in 1892, has been considered Curzon's magnum opus and can be seen as a sequel to Russia in Central Asia. Curzon was commissioned by The Times to write several articles on the Persian political environment, but while there he decided to write a book on the country as whole. This two-volume work covers Persia's history and governmental structure, as well as graphics, maps and pictures (some taken by Curzon himself). Curzon was aided by General Albert Houtum-Schindler and the Royal Geographical Society (RGS), both of which helped him gain access to material to which as a foreigner he would not have been entitled to have access. General Schindler provided Curzon with information regarding Persia's geography and resources, as well as serving as an unofficial editor.

Curzon was appalled by his government's apathy towards Persia as a valuable defensive buffer to India from Russian encroachment. Years later Curzon would lament that "Persia has alternatively advanced and receded in the estimation of British statesmen, occupying now a position of extravagant prominence, anon one of unmerited obscurity."

First marriage (1895–1906) 

In 1895 he married Mary Victoria Leiter, the daughter of Levi Ziegler Leiter, an American millionaire of German Mennonite origin and co-founder of the Chicago department store Field & Leiter (later Marshall Field). Initially, he had just married her for her money so he could save his estate but subsequently developing feelings for her. Mary had a long and nearly fatal illness near the end of summer 1904, from which she never really recovered. Falling ill again in July 1906, she died on the 18th of that month in her husband's arms, at the age of 36. It was the greatest personal loss of his life.

She was buried in the church at Kedleston, where Curzon designed his memorial for her, a Gothic chapel added to the north side of the nave. Although he was neither a devout nor a conventional churchman, Curzon retained a simple religious faith; in later years he sometimes said that he was not afraid of death because it would enable him to join Mary in heaven.

They had three daughters during a firm and happy marriage: Mary Irene, who inherited her father's Barony of Ravensdale and was created a life peer in her own right; Cynthia, who became the first wife of the fascist politician Sir Oswald Mosley; and Alexandra Naldera ("Baba"), who married Edward "Fruity" Metcalfe, the best friend, best man and equerry of Edward VIII. Mosley exercised a strange fascination for the Curzon women: Irene had a brief romance with him before either were married; Baba became his mistress; and Curzon's second wife, Grace, had a long affair with him.

Viceroy of India (1899–1905) 

In January 1899 Curzon was appointed as Viceroy of India. He was created a baron in the peerage of Ireland as Baron Curzon of Kedleston, in the County of Derby, on his appointment. As Viceroy, he was ex officio Grand Master of the Order of the Indian Empire and Order of the Star of India. This peerage was created in the Peerage of Ireland (the last so created) so that he would be free, until his father's death, to re-enter the House of Commons on his return to Britain.

Reaching India shortly after the suppression of the frontier risings of 1897–98, he paid special attention to the independent tribes of the north-west frontier, inaugurated a new province called the North West Frontier Province, and pursued a policy of forceful control mingled with conciliation. In response to what he called "a number of murderous attacks upon Englishmen and Europeans", Curzon advocated at the Quetta Durbar extremely draconian punishments which he believed would stop what he viewed as such especially abominable crimes. In his own private correspondence, Curzon pondered "Is it possible, under the law, to flog these horrible scoundrels before we execute them? Supposing we remove them for execution to another and distant jail, could we flog them in the first jail before removal? I believe that if we could postpone the execution for a few weeks and give the criminal a few good public floggings - or even one, were more not possible - it would act as a real deterrent. But I have a suspicion that British law does not smile upon anything so eminently practical." The only major armed outbreak on this frontier during the period of his administration was the Mahsud–Waziri campaign of 1901.

In the context of the Great Game between the British and Russian Empires for control of Central Asia, he held deep mistrust of Russian intentions. This led him to encourage British trade in Persia, and he paid a visit to the Persian Gulf in 1903. Curzon argued for an exclusive British presence in the Gulf, a policy originally proposed by John Malcolm. The British government was already making agreements with local sheiks/tribal leaders along the Persian Gulf coast to this end. Curzon had convinced his government to establish Britain as the unofficial protector of Kuwait with the Anglo-Kuwaiti Agreement of 1899. The Lansdowne Declaration in 1903 stated that the British would counter any other European power's attempt to establish a military presence in the Gulf. Only four years later this position was abandoned and the Persian Gulf declared a neutral zone in the Anglo-Russian Agreement of 1907, prompted in part by the high economic cost of defending India from Russian advances.

At the end of 1903, Curzon sent a British expedition to Tibet under Francis Younghusband, ostensibly to forestall a Russian advance. After bloody conflicts with Tibet's poorly armed defenders, the mission penetrated to Lhasa, where the Treaty of Lhasa was signed in September 1904.

During his tenure, Curzon undertook the restoration of the Taj Mahal and expressed satisfaction that he had done so. Curzon was influenced by Hindu philosophy and quoted: 

Within India, Curzon appointed a number of commissions to inquire into education, irrigation, police and other branches of administration, on whose reports legislation was based during his second term of office as viceroy. Reappointed Governor-General in August 1904, he presided over the 1905 partition of Bengal.
Curzon was determined to address the British maltreatment of Indians. In particular, he incurred the displeasure of many in the European community in India by pressing for severe punishment for Europeans who had attacked Indians. On two occasions, he imposed collective punishment on British Army units which had attacked Indians: when soldiers of the West Kent Regiment raped a Burmese woman, he had the whole regiment exiled to Aden without leave. He later imposed similar punishment on the 9th Queen's Royal Lancers for the murder of an Indian cook.

Curzon proposed the Partition of Bengal and put it into effect on 16 October 1905 creating the new province of Eastern Bengal and Assam.

Indian Army 
Curzon also took an active interest in military matters. In 1901, he founded the Imperial Cadet Corps, or ICC. The ICC was a corps d'elite, designed to give Indian princes and aristocrats military training, after which a few would be given officer commissions in the Indian Army. But these commissions were "special commissions" which did not empower their holders to command any troops. Predictably, this was a major stumbling block to the ICC's success, as it caused much resentment among former cadets. Though the ICC closed in 1914, it was a crucial stage in the drive to Indianise the Indian Army's officer Corps, which was haltingly begun in 1917.

Military organisation proved to be the final issue faced by Curzon in India. It often involved petty issues that had much to do with clashes of personality: Curzon once wrote on a document "I rise from the perusal of these papers filled with the sense of the ineptitude of my military advisers", and once wrote to the Commander-in-Chief in India, Kitchener, advising him that signing himself "Kitchener of Khartoum" took up too much time and space, which Kitchener thought petty (Curzon simply signed himself "Curzon" as if he were a hereditary peer, although he later took to signing himself "Curzon of Kedleston"). A difference of opinion with Kitchener, regarding the status of the military member of the council in India (who controlled army supply and logistics, which Kitchener wanted under his own control), led to a controversy in which Curzon failed to obtain the support of the home government. He resigned in August 1905 and returned to England.

Return to Britain 
Arthur Balfour's refusal to recommend an earldom for Curzon in 1905 was repeated by Sir Henry Campbell-Bannerman, the Liberal Prime Minister, who formed his government the day after Curzon returned to England. In deference to the wishes of the King and the advice of his doctors, Curzon did not stand in the general election of 1906 and thus found himself excluded from public life for the first time in twenty years. It was at this time, the nadir of his career, that he suffered the greatest personal loss of his life.

Mary died in 1906 and Curzon devoted himself to private matters, including establishing a new home. 

After the death of Lord Goschen in 1907, the post of Chancellor of Oxford University fell vacant. Curzon successfully became elected as Chancellor of Oxford after he won by 1,001 votes to 440 against Lord Rosebery. He proved to be quite an active chancellor – "[he] threw himself so energetically into the cause of university reform that critics complained he was ruling Oxford like an Indian province."

House of Lords
In 1908, Curzon was elected a representative peer for Ireland, and thus relinquished any idea of returning to the House of Commons. In 1909–1910 he took an active part in opposing the Liberal government's proposal to abolish the legislative veto of the House of Lords, and in 1911 was created Baron Ravensdale, of Ravensdale in the County of Derby, with remainder (in default of heirs male) to his daughters, Viscount Scarsdale, of Scarsdale in the County of Derby, with remainder (in default of heirs male) to the heirs male of his father, and Earl Curzon of Kedleston, in the County of Derby, with the normal remainder, all in the Peerage of the United Kingdom.

He became involved with saving Tattershall Castle, Lincolnshire, from destruction. This experience strengthened his resolve for heritage protection. He was one of the sponsors of the Ancient Monuments Consolidation and Amendment Act 1913. He served as President of the Committee commissioning the Survey of London which documented the capital's principal buildings and public art. 

On 5 May 1914, he spoke out against a bill in the House of Lords that would have permitted women who already had the right to vote in local elections the right to vote for members of Parliament.

First World War 

Curzon joined the Cabinet, as Lord Privy Seal, when Asquith formed his coalition in May 1915. Like other politicians (e.g. Austen Chamberlain, Arthur Balfour) Curzon favoured British Empire efforts in Mesopotamia, believing that the increase in British prestige would discourage a German-inspired Muslim revolt in India. Curzon was a member of the Dardanelles Committee and told that body (October 1915) that the recent Salonika expedition was "quixotic chivalry". Early in 1916 Curzon visited Sir Douglas Haig (newly appointed Commander-in-Chief of British forces in France) at his headquarters in France. Haig was impressed by Curzon's brains and decisiveness, and considered that he had mellowed since his days as Viceroy (Major-General Haig had been Inspector-General of Cavalry, India, at the time) and had lost "his old pompous ways". Curzon served in Lloyd George's small War Cabinet as Leader of the House of Lords from December 1916, and he also served on the War Policy Committee. With Allied victory over Germany far from certain, Curzon wrote a paper (12 May 1917) for the War Cabinet urging that Britain seize Palestine and possibly Syria. Like other members of the War Cabinet, Curzon supported further Western Front offensives lest, with Russian commitment to the war wavering, France and Italy be tempted to make a separate peace.

At the War Policy Committee (3 October 1917) Curzon objected in vain to plans to redeploy two divisions to Palestine, with a view to advancing into Syria and knocking Turkey out of the war altogether. Curzon's commitment wavered somewhat as the losses of the Third Battle of Ypres mounted. In the summer of 1917 the Chief of the Imperial General Staff (CIGS) General William Robertson sent Haig a biting description of the members of the War Cabinet, who he said were all frightened of Lloyd George; he described Curzon as "a gasbag". During the crisis of February 1918, Curzon was one of the few members of the government to support Robertson, threatening in vain to resign if he were removed. Despite his opposition to women's suffrage (he had been co-president of the National League for Opposing Woman Suffrage), the House of Lords voted conclusively in its favour.

Second marriage (1917) 

After a long affair with the romantic novelist Elinor Glyn, Curzon married the former Grace Elvina Hinds in January 1917. She was the wealthy Alabama-born widow of Alfredo Huberto Duggan (died 1915), a first-generation Irish Argentinian appointed to the Argentine Legation in London in 1905. Elinor Glyn was staying with Curzon at the time of the engagement and read about it in the morning newspapers.

Grace had three children from her first marriage, two sons, Alfred and Hubert, and a daughter, Grace Lucille. Alfred and Hubert, as Curzon's step-sons, grew up within his influential circle. Curzon had three daughters from his first marriage, but he and Grace (despite fertility-related operations and several miscarriages) did not have any children together, which put a strain on their marriage. Letters written between them in the early 1920s imply that they still lived together, and remained devoted to each other. In 1923, Curzon was passed over for the office of Prime Minister partly on the advice of Arthur Balfour, who joked that Curzon "has lost the hope of glory but he still possesses the means of Grace" (a humorous allusion to the well known "General Thanksgiving" prayer of the Church of England, which thanks God for "the means of grace, and for the hope of glory").

In 1917, Curzon bought Bodiam Castle in East Sussex, a 14th-century building that had been gutted during the English Civil War. He restored it extensively, and then bequeathed it to the National Trust.

Foreign Secretary (1919–24)

Relations with Lloyd George
Curzon did not have David Lloyd George's support. Curzon and Lloyd George had disliked one another since the 1911 Parliament Crisis. The Prime Minister thought him overly pompous and self-important, and it was said that he used him as if he were using a Rolls-Royce to deliver a parcel to the station; Lloyd George said much later that Churchill treated his Ministers in a way that Lloyd George would never have treated his: "They were all men of substance — well, except Curzon." Multiple drafts of resignation letters written at this time were found upon Curzon's death. Despite their antagonism, the two were often in agreement on government policy. Lloyd George needed the wealth of knowledge Curzon possessed so was both his biggest critic and, simultaneously, his largest supporter. Likewise, Curzon was grateful for the leeway he was allowed by Lloyd George when it came to handling affairs in the Middle East.

Other cabinet ministers also respected his vast knowledge of Central Asia but disliked his arrogance and often blunt criticism. Believing that the Foreign Secretary should be non-partisan, he would objectively present all the information on a subject to the Cabinet, as if placing faith in his colleagues to reach the appropriate decision. Conversely, Curzon would take personally and respond aggressively to any criticism.

It has been suggested that Curzon's defensiveness reflected institutional insecurity by the Foreign Office as a whole. During the 1920s the Foreign Office was often a passive participant in decisions which were mainly reactive and dominated by the Prime Minister. The creation of the job of Colonial Secretary, the Cabinet Secretariat and the League of Nations added to the Foreign Office's insecurity.

Policy under Lloyd George

After nine months as acting Secretary while Balfour was at the Paris Peace Conference, Curzon was appointed Foreign Secretary in October 1919. He gave his name to the British government's proposed Soviet-Polish boundary, the Curzon Line of December 1919. Although during the subsequent Russo-Polish War, Poland conquered ground in the east, after World War II, Poland was shifted westwards, leaving the border between Poland and its eastern neighbours today approximately at the Curzon Line.

Curzon was largely responsible for the Peace Day ceremonies on 19 July 1919. These included the plaster Cenotaph, designed by the noted architect Sir Edwin Lutyens, for the Allied Victory parade in London. It was so successful that it was reproduced in stone, and still stands.

In 1918, during World War I, as Britain occupied Mesopotamia, Curzon tried to convince the Indian government to reconsider his scheme for Persia to be a buffer against Russian advances. British and Indian troops were in Persia protecting the oilfields at Abadan and watching the Afghan frontier – Curzon believed that British economic and military aid, sent via India, could prop up the Persian government and make her a British client state. However, the agreement of August 1919 was never ratified and the British government rejected the plan as Russia had the geographical advantage and the defensive benefits would not justify the high economic cost.

Small British forces had twice occupied Baku on the Caspian in 1918, while an entire British division had occupied Batum on the Black Sea, supervising German and Turkish withdrawal. Against Curzon's wishes, but on the advice of Sir George Milne, the commander on the spot, the CIGS Sir Henry Wilson, who wanted to concentrate troops in Britain, Ireland, India, and Egypt, and of Churchill (Secretary of State for War), the British withdrew from Baku (the small British naval presence was also withdrawn from the Caspian Sea), at the end of August 1919 leaving only three battalions at Batum.

In January 1920 Curzon insisted that British troops remain in Batum, against the wishes of Wilson and the Prime Minister. In February, while Curzon was on holiday, Wilson persuaded the Cabinet to allow withdrawal, but Curzon had the decision reversed on his return, although to Curzon's fury (he thought it "abuse of authority") Wilson gave Milne permission to withdraw if he deemed it necessary. At Cabinet on 5 May 1920 Curzon "by a long-winded jaw" (in Wilson's description) argued for a stay in Batum. After a British garrison at Enzeli (on the Persian Caspian coast) was taken prisoner by Bolshevik forces on 19 May 1920, Lloyd George finally insisted on a withdrawal from Batum early in June 1920. For the rest of 1920 Curzon, supported by Milner (Colonial Secretary), argued that Britain should retain control of Persia. When Wilson asked (15 July 1920) to pull troops out of Persia to put down the rebellion in Mesopotamia and Ireland, Lloyd George blocked the move, saying that Curzon "would not stand it". In the end, financial retrenchment forced a British withdrawal from Persia in the spring of 1921.

Curzon worked on several Middle Eastern problems. He designed the Treaty of Sèvres (August 10, 1920) between the victorious Allies and Ottoman Turkey. The treaty abolished the Ottoman Empire and obliged Turkey to renounce all rights over Arab Asia and North Africa. However a new government in Turkey under Kemal Atatürk rejected the treaty. The Greeks invaded Turkey. Curzon tried and failed to induce the Greeks to accept a compromise on the status of Smyrna and failed to force the Turks to renounce their nationalist program. Lloyd George tried to use force at Chanak but lost support and was forced to step down as prime minister. Curzon remained as foreign minister and helped tie down loose ends in the Middle East at the peace conference at Lausanne.

Curzon helped to negotiate Egyptian independence (agreed in 1922) and the division of the British Mandate of Palestine, despite the strong disagreement he held with the policy of his predecessor Arthur Balfour, and helped create the Emirate of Transjordan for Faisal's brother, which may also have delayed the problems there. According to Sir David Gilmour, Curzon "was the only senior figure in the British government at the time who foresaw that its policy would lead to decades of Arab–Jewish hostility".

During the Irish War of Independence, but before the introduction of martial law in December 1920, Curzon suggested the "Indian" solution of blockading villages and imposing collective fines for attacks on the police and army.

In 1921 Curzon was created Earl of Kedleston, in the County of Derby, and Marquess Curzon of Kedleston.

In 1922, he was the chief negotiator for the Allies of the Treaty of Lausanne, which officially ended the war with the Ottoman Empire and defined the borders of Turkey.

Curzon defended the geopolitical talent of Eyre Crowe, who served as Permanent Under-Secretary at the Foreign Office from 1920 until his death in 1925.

Under Bonar Law
Unlike many leading Conservative members of Lloyd George's Coalition Cabinet, Curzon ceased to support Lloyd George over the Chanak Crisis and had just resigned when Conservative backbenchers voted at the Carlton Club meeting to end the Coalition in October 1922. Curzon was thus able to remain Foreign Secretary when Bonar Law formed a purely Conservative ministry.

In 1922–23 Curzon had to negotiate with France after French troops occupied the Ruhr to enforce the payment of German reparations; he described the French Prime Minister (and former President) Raymond Poincaré as a "horrid little man". Curzon had expansive ambitions and was not much happier with Bonar Law, whose foreign policy was based on "retrenchment and withdrawal", than he had been with Lloyd George. However he provided invaluable insight into the Middle East and was instrumental in shaping British foreign policy in that region.

Passed over for the premiership, 1923

On Bonar Law's retirement as prime minister in May 1923, Curzon was passed over for the job in favour of Stanley Baldwin, despite his eagerness for the job.

This decision was taken on the private advice of leading members of the party including former Prime Minister Arthur Balfour. Balfour advised the monarch that in a democratic age it was inappropriate for the prime minister to be a member of the House of Lords, especially when the Labour Party, which had few peers, had become the main opposition party in the Commons. In private Balfour admitted that he was prejudiced against Curzon, whose character was objectionable to some. George V shared this prejudice. A letter purporting to detail the opinions of Bonar Law but actually written by Baldwin sympathisers was delivered to the King's Private Secretary Lord Stamfordham, though it is unclear how much impact this had in the outcome. Curzon felt he was cheated because J. C. C. Davidson—to whom Baldwin was loyal—and Sir Charles Waterhouse falsely claimed to Stamfordham that Law had recommended that George V appoint Stanley Baldwin, not Curzon, as his successor. Harry Bennett says Curzon's arrogance and unpopularity probably prevented him from becoming prime minister despite his brilliance, great capacity for work and accomplishments.

Winston Churchill, one of Curzon's main rivals, accurately contended that Curzon "sow[ed] gratitude and resentment along his path with equally lavish hands". Even contemporaries who envied Curzon, such as Baldwin, conceded that Curzon was, in the words of his biographer Leonard Mosley, "a devoted and indefatigable public servant, dedicated to the idea of Empire".

Curzon, summoned by Stamfordham, rushed to London assuming he was to be appointed. He burst into tears when told the truth. He later ridiculed Baldwin as "a man of the utmost insignificance", although he served under Baldwin and proposed him for the leadership of the Conservative Party. Curzon remained foreign secretary under Baldwin until the government fell in January 1924. When Baldwin formed a new government in November 1924 he appointed Curzon Lord President of the Council. 

Curzon's rejection was a turning point in the nation's political history. Henceforth, by convention peers were deemed to be barred from being leaders of major political parties and from becoming prime minister. In an age of democracy, it was no longer acceptable for the prime minister to be based in an unelected and largely powerless chamber.

Death

In March 1925 Curzon suffered a severe haemorrhage of the bladder. Surgery was unsuccessful and he died in London on 20 March 1925 at the age of 66. His coffin, made from the same tree at Kedleston that had encased his first wife, Mary, was taken to Westminster Abbey and from there to his ancestral home in Derbyshire, where he was interred beside Mary in the family vault at All Saints Church on 26 March. In his will, proven on 22 July, Curzon bequeathed his estate to his wife and his brother Francis; his estate was valued for probate at £343,279 10s. 4d. (roughly equivalent to £ million in ).

Upon his death the barony, earldom and marquessate of Curzon of Kedleston and the earldom of Kedleston became extinct, while the viscountcy and barony of Scarsdale were inherited by a nephew. The barony of Ravensdale was inherited by his eldest daughter Mary and is today held by his second daughter Cynthia's great-grandson, Daniel Nicholas Mosley, 4th Baron Ravensdale.

There is a blue plaque on the house in London where Curzon lived and died, No. 1 Carlton House Terrace, Westminster.

Titles 
On his appointment as Viceroy of India in 1898, he was created Baron Curzon of Kedleston, in the County of Derby. This title was created in the Peerage of Ireland to enable him to potentially return to the House of Commons, as Irish peers did not have an automatic right to sit in the House of Lords. His was the last title to be created in the Peerage of Ireland. In 1908, he was elected a representative of the Irish peerage in the British House of Lords, from which it followed that he would be a member of the House of Lords until death; indeed, his representative peerage would continue even if (as proved to be the case) he later received a United Kingdom peerage entitling him to a seat in the House of Lords in his own right.

In 1911 he was created Earl Curzon of Kedleston, Viscount Scarsdale, and Baron Ravensdale. All of these titles were in the Peerage of the United Kingdom.

Upon his father's death in 1916, he also became 5th Baron Scarsdale, in the Peerage of Great Britain. The title had been created in 1761.

In the 1921 Birthday Honours, he was created Marquess Curzon of Kedleston. The title became extinct upon his death in 1925, as he was survived by three daughters and no sons.

Assessment 
Few statesmen have experienced such changes in fortune in both their public and their personal lives. 
David Gilmour concludes:

Curzon's career was an almost unparalleled blend of triumph and disappointment. Although he was the last and in many ways the greatest of Victorian viceroys, his term of office ended in resignation, empty of recognition and barren of reward.... he was unable to assert himself fully as Foreign Secretary until the last weeks of Lloyd George's premiership. And finally, after he had restored his reputation at Lausanne, his last ambition was thwarted by George V.
	
Critics generally agreed that Curzon never reached the heights that his youthful talents had seemed destined to reach. This sense of opportunities missed was summed up by Winston Churchill in his book Great Contemporaries (1937):The morning had been golden; the noontide was bronze; and the evening lead. But all were polished until it shone after its fashion.

Churchill also wrote there was certainly something lacking in Curzon:it was certainly not information nor application, nor power of speech nor attractiveness of manner and appearance. Everything was in his equipment. You could unpack his knapsack and take an inventory item by item. Nothing on the list was missing, yet somehow or other the total was incomplete.

His Cabinet colleague The Earl of Crawford provided a withering personal judgment in his diary; "I never knew a man less loved by his colleagues and more hated by his subordinates, never a man so bereft of conscience, of charity or of gratitude. On the other hand the combination of power, of industry, and of ambition with a mean personality is almost without parallel. I never attended a funeral ceremony at which the congregation was so dry-eyed!"

The first leader of independent India, Jawaharlal Nehru, paid Curzon a surprising tribute, referring to the fact that Curzon as Viceroy exhibited real love of Indian culture and ordered a restoration project for several historic monuments, including the Taj Mahal:

After every other Viceroy has been forgotten, Curzon will be remembered because he restored all that was beautiful in India.

Legacy
By special remainders, although he had no son, two of Curzon's peerages survive to the present day. His barony of Ravensdale went first to his eldest daughter, Irene Curzon, 2nd Baroness Ravensdale, and then to his grandson Nicholas Mosley, both of whom sat in the House of Lords, while his Viscount Scarsdale title went to a nephew. His great-great-grandson Daniel Mosley, 4th Baron Ravensdale, is a current member of the House of Lords, having been elected as a representative hereditary peer.

Curzon Hall, the home of the faculty of science at the University of Dhaka, is named after him. Lord Curzon himself inaugurated the building in 1904.

Curzon Gate, a ceremonial gate, was erected by Maharaja Bijay Chand Mahatab in the heart of Burdwan town and was renamed to commemorate Lord Curzon's visit to the town in 1904, which was renamed as Bijay Toran after the independence of India in 1947.

Curzon Road, the road connecting India Gate, the memorial dedicated to the Indian fallen during the Great War of 1914–18, and Connaught Place, in New Delhi was named after him. It has since been renamed Kasturba Gandhi Marg. The apartment buildings on the same road are still named after him.

References

Bibliography

George Nathaniel Curzon's writings 
 Curzon, Russia in Central Asia in 1889 and the Anglo-Russian Question (1889) Frank Cass & Co. Ltd., London (reprinted Cass, 1967), Adamant Media Corporation;  (27 February 2001) Reprint (Paperback) Details
 Curzon, Persia and the Persian Question (1892) Longmans, Green, and Co., London and New York.; facsimile reprint:
 Volume 1 (Paperback) by George Nathaniel Curzon, Adamant Media Corporation;  (22 October 2001) Abstract
 Volume 2 (Paperback) by George Nathaniel Curzon, Adamant Media Corporation;  (22 October 2001) Abstract
Curzon, On the Indian Frontier, Edited with an introduction by Dhara Anjaria; (Oxford U.P. 2011) 350 pages 
 Curzon, Problems of the Far East (1894; new ed., 1896) George Nathaniel Curzon Problems of the Far East.
 Curzon, The Pamirs and the Source of the Oxus, 1897, The Royal Geographical Society. Geographical Journal 8 (1896): 97–119, 239–63. A thorough study of the region's history and people and of the British–Russian conflict of interest in Turkestan based on Curzon's travels there in 1894. Reprint (paperback): Adamant Media Corporation,  (22 April 2002) Abstract. Unabridged reprint (2005): Elbiron Classics, Adamant Media Corporation;  (pbk);  (hardcover).
 Curzon, The Romanes Lecture 1907, FRONTIERS by the Right Hon Lord Curzon of Kedleston G.C.S.I., G.C.I.E., PC, D.C.L., LL.D., F.R.S., All Souls College, Chancellor of the University, Delivered in the Sheldonian Theatre, Oxford, 2 November 1907 full text.
 Curzon, Tales of Travel. First published by Hodder & Stoughton 1923 (Century Classic Ser.) London, Century. 1989, Facsimile Reprint; ; reprint with foreword by Lady Alexandra Metcalfe, Introduction by Peter King. A selection of Curzon's travel writing including essays on Egypt, Afghanistan, Persia, Iran, India, Iraq Waterfalls, etc. (includes the future viceroy's escapade into Afghanistan to meet the "Iron Emir", Abdu Rahman Khan, in 1894)
 Curzon, Bodiam Castle Sussex. A Historical & Descriptive Survey Jonathan Cape, London, (1926)
 Curzon and H. Avray Tipping, 'Tattershall Castle, Lincolnshire: A Historical & Descriptive Survey by the Late Marquis Curzon of Kedleston, K.G. and H. Avray Tipping, 1929, Jonathan Cape, London, (Finished by Henry Avray Tipping after Curzon's death)

Secondary sources 
 Bennet, G. H. (1995). British Foreign Policy During the Curzon Period, 1919–1924. New York: St. Martin's Press. .
 Carrington, Michael. Officers, Gentlemen, and Murderers: Lord Curzon's campaign against ‘collisions’ between Indians and Europeans, 1899–1905,Modern Asian Studies 47:03, May 2013, pp. 780–819.
 Carrington, Michael. A PhD thesis, Empire and authority: Curzon, collisions, character and the Raj, 1899–1905. Discusses a number of interesting issues raised during Curzon's Viceroyalty (available through British Library).
 
 De Groot, Gerard Douglas Haig 1861–1928 (Larkfield, Maidstone: Unwin Hyman, 1988)
 Dilks, David; Curzon in India (2 volumes, 1970) online edition
 Edwardes, Michael. "The Viceroyalty Of Lord Curzon" History Today (Dec 1962) 12#12 pp 833–844
 Edwardes, Michael. High Noon of Empire: India under Curzon (1965)
 Gilmour, David (1994). Curzon: Imperial Statesman. Farrar, Straus & Giroux. excerpt and text search
 Gilmour, David. "Curzon, George Nathaniel, Marquess Curzon of Kedleston (1859–1925)" Oxford Dictionary of National Biography 2004; online edn, Jan 2011 accessed 30 Sept 2014 doi:10.1093/ref:odnb/32680
 Goudie A. S. (1980). "George Nathaniel Curzon: Superior Geographer", The Geographical Journal, 146, 2 (1980): 203–209,  Abstract
 Goradia, Nayana. Lord Curzon The Last of the British Moghuls (1993) full text online free.
 
 Katouzian, Homa. "The Campaign Against the Anglo-Iranian Agreement of 1919." British Journal of Middle Eastern Studies 25 (1) (1998): 5–46.
Loades, David, ed. Reader's Guide to British History (2003) 1:324-25; historiography
 
 McLane, John R. "The Decision to Partition Bengal in 1905", Indian Economic and Social History Review, July 1965, 2#3, pp 221–237
 Mosley, Leonard Oswald. The glorious fault: The life of Lord Curzon (1960)online
 Nicolson, Harold George (1934). Curzon: The Last Phase, 1919–1925: A Study in Post-war Diplomacy. London: Constable.  
 Reid, Walter. Architect of Victory: Douglas Haig (Birlinn Ltd, Edinburgh, 2006.) 
 Ronaldshay, Earl of (1927). The Life of Lord Curzon. (Two volumes; London)
 Rose, Kenneth. Superior Person: A Portrait of Curzon and His Circle in Late Victorian England, Weidenfeld & Nicolson History, 
 Ross, Christopher N. B. "Lord Curzon and E. G. Browne Confront the 'Persian Question, Historical Journal, 52, 2 (2009): 385–411, 
 Woodward, David R, Field Marshal Sir William Robertson, Westport Connecticut & London: Praeger, 1998, 
 Wright, Denis. "Curzon and Persia". The Geographical Journal 153 (3) (1987): 343–350.

External links 

 Analysis of George Curzon as Viceroy
 
 India under Curzon and after, By Lovat Fraser, Published by William Heinemann, London – 1911. Digital Rare Book :
 Problems of the Far East: Japan – Korea – China by George Curzon, 1st Marquess Curzon of Kedleston at archive.org
 Modern parliamentary eloquence; the Rede lecture, delivered before the University of Cambridge, 6 November 1913 by George Curzon, 1st Marquess Curzon of Kedleston at archive.org
 Russia In Central Asia In 1889 by George Curzon, 1st Marquess Curzon of Kedleston at archive.org
 
 War poems and other translations by George Curzon, 1st Marquess Curzon of Kedleston at archive.org
 
 George Nathaniel CURZON was born 11 Jan 1859. He died 20 Mar 1925. George married Mary Victoria LEITER on 22 Apr 1895
 

|-

|-

1859 births
1890s in British India
1900s in British India
1925 deaths
19th-century viceregal rulers
Alumni of Balliol College, Oxford
Anti-suffragists
British diplomats
British Secretaries of State for Foreign Affairs
British Secretaries of State
Burials in Derbyshire
Chancellors of the University of Oxford
Curzon, George
George
Eldest sons of British hereditary barons
English expatriates in Iran
Explorers of Central Asia
Fellows of All Souls College, Oxford
Fellows of the British Academy
Fellows of the Royal Society
Irish representative peers
Knights Grand Commander of the Order of the Indian Empire
Knights Grand Commander of the Order of the Star of India
Knights of the Garter
Leaders of the Conservative Party (UK)
Leaders of the House of Lords
Lord Presidents of the Council
Lords Privy Seal
Lords Warden of the Cinque Ports
Marquesses in the Peerage of the United Kingdom
Members of the Privy Council of the United Kingdom
Peers of Ireland created by Queen Victoria
People educated at Wixenford School
People from Kedleston
People of the Victorian era
Presidents of the Oxford Union
Presidents of the Royal Geographical Society
Rectors of the University of Glasgow
Curzon, George
Curzon, George
Curzon, George
UK MPs who inherited peerages
UK MPs who were granted peerages
Viceroys of India
Viscounts Scarsdale
Peers created by George V
Barons created by George V
Barons Ravensdale
People educated at Eton College
Presidents of the Classical Association